Khoe Soe Lu Hnite is a 2016 Burmese action-drama film, directed by Steel (Dwe Myittar) starring Myint Myat, Khin Hlaing, Htun Htun, Nay Dway and Thinzar Wint Kyaw. The film, produced by Moe Film Production premiered in Myanmar on July 15, 2016.

Cast
Myint Myat as Aung One
Khin Hlaing as Ni Toot
Htun Htun as San Pyar
Nay Dway as Jeep Too
Thinzar Wint Kyaw as Hnin Si Ni

See also
Taw Kyi Kan

References

2016 films
2010s Burmese-language films
Burmese action films
Films shot in Myanmar
2016 action films